The Journal of Industrial Ecology is a bimonthly peer-reviewed academic journal covering industrial ecology. It is published by Wiley-Blackwell on behalf of the Yale School of the Environment and is an official journal of the International Society for Industrial Ecology. The editor-in-chief is Reid Lifset.  According to the Journal Citation Reports, the journal had an impact factor of 6.946 in 2020.

Abstracting and indexing 
The journal is abstracted and indexed in:

References

External links 
 

Environmental science journals
Wiley-Blackwell academic journals
Yale University academic journals
Bimonthly journals
Publications established in 1997
English-language journals
Industrial ecology
Engineering journals